James Nicolson may refer to:

 James Nicolson (bishop) (died 1607), Moderator of the General Assembly of the Church of Scotland & Bishop of Dunkeld
 James Brindley Nicolson (1917–1945), English aviator, recipient of the Victoria Cross
 James Nicolson (priest) (1832–1889), Dean of Brechin
 Jamie Nicolson (born 1971), Australian boxer

See also
James Nicholson (disambiguation)